The Canal de la Meuse is the current name of what used to be the northern branch of the Canal de l'Est ("canal of the east"). It is a canal in northeastern France, predominantly made up of the canalised river Meuse. In 2003, the northern and southern branches were officially renamed Canal de la Meuse and Canal des Vosges respectively.

Canal de la Meuse (formerly Canal de l'Est, northern branch) 

The Canal de la Meuse starts at Givet in the Ardennes département. It follows the Meuse upstream, passing through Mouzon, Fumay, Revin, Nouzonville, Charleville-Mézières, Sedan, Stenay, Verdun, Saint-Mihiel and Commercy, and joins the Canal de la Marne au Rhin at Troussey. For most of its length, the canal is the canalised river Meuse.

Canal des Vosges (formerly southern branch) 

Originally, the southern branch of the Canal de l'Est started at Toul, where it branched off the Canal de la Marne au Rhin. Since the Moselle has been made navigable for high-capacity barges up to Neuves-Maisons, the  part of the Canal de l'Est between Toul and Neuves-Maisons is considered part of the Moselle. The canal follows the Moselle upstream through Charmes and Thaon-les-Vosges until Golbey, north of Épinal, where it leaves the Moselle valley. It passes through Les Forges and enters the valley of the Côney near Uzemain. It follows the Côney downstream until its confluence with the Saône at Corre in the Haute-Saône department, the southern end of the Canal de l'Est.

Geographic latitude and longitude

See also
 List of canals in France

References

External links 
 Canal de la Meuse navigation guide; places, ports and moorings on the canal, by the author of Inland Waterways of France, Imray
 Canal des Vosges navigation guide; places, ports and moorings on the canal, by the author of Inland Waterways of France, Imray
 Navigation details for 80 French rivers and canals (French waterways website section)
, hydrological and Meuse catchment area data

Est
Canals opened in 1887